Lucien Xavier Michel-Andrianarahinjaka (30 December 1929 – 11 November 1997) was a Malagasy writer, poet, and politician. He was born in Fianarantsoa, and studied at the University of Bordeaux 3 and Paris-Sorbonne University. In 1977, he was elected to the Madagascar National Assembly, and was also elected its president. He won reelection in 1983 and 1989, and was reelected president each year until 1991, when the National Assembly was dissolved. In addition to his political career, he was a writer and poet, best known for his work involved the oral tradition of several Malagasy ethnic groups.

Early life and education 
Michel-Andrianarahinjaka was born on 30 December 1929 in Fianarantsoa, in what was then the colony of French Madagascar. He was the son of Michel Joseph Randria (1903–1977), who was a member of the French Senate and the first mayor of Fianarantsoa Province.

From 1936 to 1948, he studied at the Collège Saint Joseph Ambodisaina in Fianarantsoa, and from 1948 to 1952 he went to school in Antananarivo, the capital city. Beginning in 1952, he studied at the Faculty of Letters at Paris-Sorbonne University. In 1981, he earned his Doctor of Philosophy at University of Bordeaux 3 (now Bordeaux Montaigne University).

Political career 
From 1976 to 1977 Michel-Andrianarahinjaka was the Charge for Information of Orientation and Relations with Institutions for the President's Council. He entered the Madagascar political scene that year, at the prompting of the Rassemblement Chrétien de Madagascar, his political party. In November 1976, he was one of the founding members of the Association for the Rebirth of Madagascar (AREMA).

Michel-Andrianarahinjaka ran as an AREMA candidate in the 1977 Malagasy parliamentary election. He was elected to the National Assembly, representing the Fianarantsoa II district. That same year, he was elected President of the National Assembly. He was reelected to the National Assembly in 1983 and 1989, and was reelected president every year from 1978 to 1991. In 1991, the National Assembly was dissolved, thus ending Michel-Andrianarahinjaka's term as an MP and president. In the end, he presided over the National Assembly for the entirety of the Second Republic of Madagascar.

Michel-Andrianarahinjaka died on 11 November 1997 in Fianarantsoa.

Writing and poetry 
Michel-Andrianarahinjaka was, in addition to his politics, a published writer and poet. He was notable for his work putting Madagascar's oral literature into writing, particularly the oral tradition of the Bara and Betsileo people. He was also a professor at the Établissement d'Enseignement Supérieur de Lettres in Antananarivo.

Personal life 
Michel-Andrianarahinjaka was married and had six children. He was Roman Catholic, and his father, as a young man, was a teacher at a Catholic school.

Bibliography 
 
 
 Other publications by Michel-Andrianarahinjaka

Awards and honors

See also 
 List of Malagasy writers

References 

1929 births
1997 deaths
20th-century Malagasy people
20th-century Malagasy poets
20th-century Malagasy politicians
20th-century Roman Catholics
Association for the Rebirth of Madagascar politicians
Founders of charities
Malagasy Roman Catholics
Malagasy male poets
Members of the National Assembly (Madagascar)
Paris-Sorbonne University alumni
People from Fianarantsoa
Presidents of the National Assembly (Madagascar)
Academic staff of the University of Antananarivo
University of Bordeaux alumni
20th-century male writers